Willow Hill Township is one of eleven townships in Jasper County, Illinois, USA.  As of the 2010 census, its population was 639 and it contained 279 housing units.

Geography

Cities, towns, villages
 Willow Hill

Adjacent townships
 Hunt City Township (north)
 Oblong Township, Crawford County (east)
 Sainte Marie Township (south)
 Fox Township (southwest)
 Wade Township (west)

Cemeteries
The township contains these four cemeteries: Edison, Miller, Shiloh and Todd.

Major highways
  Illinois Route 33
  Illinois Route 49

Demographics

School districts
 Jasper County Community Unit School District 1
 Oblong Community Unit School District 4

Political districts
 Illinois' 19th congressional district
 State House District 108
 State Senate District 54

References
 
 United States Census Bureau 2007 TIGER/Line Shapefiles
 United States National Atlas

External links
 City-Data.com
 Illinois State Archives

Townships in Jasper County, Illinois
1859 establishments in Illinois
Populated places established in 1859
Townships in Illinois